= Irwin Sandberg =

American engineer

Irwin Sandberg is an American engineer, who is currently the Cockrell Family Regents Chair Emeritus in the Department of Electrical and Computer Engineering at the University of Texas at Austin.

He is a Fellow of the American Association for the Advancement of Science and the Institute of Electrical and Electronics Engineers (Life Fellow). In 1981, Sandberg was elected a member of the United States National Academy of Engineering for fundamental contributions to the understanding and analysis of nonlinear systems and for applying new methods to nonlinear engineering problems. He is also a member of the Society for Industrial and Applied Mathematics.
